Anfernee Deon "Penny" Hardaway (born July 18, 1971) is an American college basketball coach and former professional player who is the head coach of the Memphis Tigers men's basketball team in the American Athletic Conference (AAC). Hardaway played college basketball at Memphis and 14 seasons in the National Basketball Association (NBA), where he was a four-time NBA All-Star and a two-time All-NBA First Team member.

Early life
Hardaway is the son of Fae Hardaway (born 1951) and Eddie Golden. The name Anfernee  was that of a schoolmate of his mother. When she left Memphis to work in Oakland in 1974, she left her son with her mother Louise. His nickname came as a result of his grandmother's calling him "Pretty" with a southern drawl, thus sounding like "Penny". Hardaway's first love was football but his grandmother did not want him to get hurt.  He grew up in the Binghampton neighborhood of shotgun houses in Memphis, Tennessee.  As a teenager Hardaway refereed youth sports at the Memphis YMCA and played on the Memphis Y.M.C.A. Jr. Olympic basketball team.

High school career
Hardaway grew up playing basketball in Memphis for Treadwell High School  where he averaged 36.6 points, 10.1 rebounds, 6.2 assists, 3.9 steals, and 2.8 blocks as a senior and was named Parade Magazine National High School player of the year. He finished his high school career with 3,039 points.

College career
At Memphis State University (now the University of Memphis), Hardaway had to sit out the 1990–91 season with the Memphis State Tigers due to being academically ineligible according to the Proposition 48 regulation. His grades were so low that he was admitted to the University on a special exemption from University President Thomas G. Carpenter. He took the ACT five times with a maximum score of 17.2, with 17.5 being required to be eligible to play in college.

While he was sitting out, Hardaway was robbed at gunpoint outside his cousin LaMarcus Golden's house and was shot in his foot by a stray bullet, putting his career in jeopardy. After he was inspired to do better in life and to accomplish more, he made the Dean's List with a 3.4 grade-point average as an education major.

In the summer of 1992 Hardaway was selected to the 1992 USA Basketball Developmental Team that scrimmaged daily against the 1992 Olympic Team. Hardaway was teammates with Chris Webber, Bobby Hurley, Jamal Mashburn, Rodney Rogers, Eric Montross, Grant Hill, and Allan Houston.

Hardaway returned for his junior season (1992–93) and bettered his numbers from the previous season. He averaged 22.8 ppg, 8.5 rpg, 6.4 apg, 2.4 spg, and 1.2 bpg. He accumulated two triple doubles. He was again named an All-American. He also was a finalist for the Naismith College Player of the Year and the John R. Wooden Award that are annually given the most outstanding player in college basketball.

Hardaway achieved a 3.4 cumulative GPA, but passed up his senior season to enter the 1993 NBA Draft. In 1994, Memphis State retired his jersey number, 25, Hardaway's number while playing for the Tigers. He returned to the University of Memphis in May 2003 and graduated with a bachelor's degree in professional studies, ten years after leaving school early to turn pro.

Hardaway was named #5 on the list of top 100 modern college point guards by collegehoopsnet.com. Additionally, he was a leading vote getter on ESPN Conference USA Silver Anniversary Team.

Professional career

Orlando Magic (1993–1999)

1993–94 season: All-Rookie honors 
Hardaway was selected by the Golden State Warriors in the first round of the 1993 NBA draft (third pick overall), but was traded along with three future first-round picks to the Orlando Magic for the rights to first overall pick Chris Webber. The Magic's intent was to draft Webber and pair him with Shaquille O'Neal until Hardaway – whose desire was to play alongside O'Neal – requested a second workout to show why he should be their pick. Two days before the draft, Hardaway participated in a pick-up basketball game with several Magic players and local talent and impressed the organization enough to make the draft day trade.

He started out the season at the shooting guard position while he learned the point guard position from veteran Scott Skiles. By mid-season he took over point guard duties from Skiles. He immediately made an impact on the league, winning the MVP award at the inaugural Schick Rookie Game. Hardaway helped the Magic to their first playoff berth and first 50-win season. He averaged 16 points, 6.6 assists, 5.4 rebounds per game while his 190 steals ranked 6th in the league. He recorded his first career triple double on April 15 when he registered 14 points, 12 assists, and 11 rebounds against the Boston Celtics. For his efforts he was named to the NBA All-Rookie first team and was the runner-up for Rookie of the Year to Chris Webber.

1994–95 season: First All-Star and NBA Finals appearance 
During the 1994–95 NBA season, the Magic won a franchise record 57 games while Hardaway averaged 20.9 points, 7.2 assists, 4.4 rebounds, and 1.7 steals per game. He was named a starter in his first NBA All-Star game and was named All-NBA First Team. The highlight of the playoff run was the second-round defeat of the Chicago Bulls. Along with Shaquille O'Neal, he led his team to the NBA Finals, where they were swept by the Houston Rockets. Despite the sweep Hardaway averaged 25.5 points, 4.8 rebounds and 8 assists in the series, while shooting 50% from the field.

1995–96 season: 2nd All-NBA First Team selection and surgery 
An injury to star teammate Shaquille O'Neal at the start of the 1995–96 NBA season forced Hardaway to garner more of the scoring load during the first few weeks of the season. He responded by leading the Magic to a 17–5 start. He was named NBA Player of the Month for November by averaging 27.0 points, 6.5 assists, 5.8 rebounds, 2.2 steals, and 1 block per game. He was named a starter in the NBA All-Star Game for the second consecutive season while leading the Magic to a franchise record 60 wins. For the season he was named to the All-NBA First Team for the second consecutive year while averaging 21.7 points, 7.1 assists and 4.3 rebounds and capturing 166 steals which was good for 5th in the league. He also finished third in MVP voting. Hardaway was again the only player in the NBA who averaged at least 20 points and five assists and shot 50 percent on field goals during the regular season. The Magic's playoff run ended in the Eastern Conference Finals to the eventual champion Chicago Bulls. In the 12-game playoff run Hardaway averaged 23.3 points, 6 assists, and 4.7 rebounds.

Hardaway later admitted his first serious knee injury was a 1996 playoff game against Detroit when Joe Dumars hit him in the back of his knee but played through the pain. He then said he underwent surgery during the off-season and felt that the injury had robbed him of his explosiveness.

1996–97 season: Olympic gold medal and franchise player 
During the summer of 1996, Hardaway played on the 1996 US Olympic Games Basketball Team, which won a gold medal. Hardaway averaged 9 points, 4.4 assists, 2.8 rebounds, and 1.4 steals in the eight games. His two biggest contributions were in the quarterfinal game against Brazil where he chipped in 14 points and in the gold medal game against Yugoslavia where he scored 17 points.

The departure of O'Neal during the off-season to the Los Angeles Lakers left Hardaway as the lone star on the Magic heading into the 1996–97 NBA season. Hardaway struggled through an injury-filled season but still managed to be named a starter for the third consecutive time in the NBA All-Star game. During the season, Hardaway, being the team leader, led a coup to fire then coach Brian Hill with only 33 games left during the season. In 59 regular-season games he averaged 20.5 points, 5.6 assists, 4.5 rebounds, and 1.6 steals per game and was named to the All-NBA Third Team. The Magic managed to make the playoffs with a 45-win season. In the playoffs the Magic fell 0–2 to the Miami Heat in the first round. Hardaway then scored 42 points in game 3 and 41 in Game 4 to force a Game 5 in Miami (becoming the 1st player in NBA history to score 40 points in back to back playoff games when his team scores less than 100 while also being the first player to score 40 points back to back in the playoffs against a Pat Riley-coached team). Hardaway scored 33 points in Game 5 but the Magic fell short. Hardaway finished the playoffs with averages of 31 points, 6 rebounds, 3.4 assists, 2.4 steals, and 1.4 blocks per game. His playoff scoring average finished a close second to Michael Jordan (31.1).

1997–98 season: Knee injury 
A devastating left knee injury incurred early in the 1997–98 NBA season required surgery and forced Hardaway to miss the majority of the season. Despite injury, he was voted to start NBA All-Star Game for fourth straight year, and had six points and three assists in 12 minutes at New York. However, he was criticized for attempting a comeback sooner than expected by playing in the All-Star Game. He played his last game a week after the All-Star game and missed the remainder of the season (Hardaway had since endured another four surgeries on his left knee up to the present that had gradually deteriorated his explosive athletic abilities). In 19 games he averaged 16.4 points, 4 rebounds, 3.6 assists, and 1.5 steals.

1998–99 season: Final season in Orlando 
Hardaway returned during the lockout-shortened 1999 season and managed to play in all 50 regular-season games to lead the Magic to a share of the best regular-season record in the Eastern Conference. He averaged 15.8 points, 5.7 rebounds and 5.3 assists, and his 111 steals placed him 5th in the league. The Magic then lost a first-round series to the Philadelphia 76ers in which Hardaway averaged 19 points, 5.5 assists, 5 rebounds, and 2.3 steals. It would prove to be his final season in Orlando.

In the Summer of 1999, at the urging of Phoenix Suns' point guard Jason Kidd, Hardaway was traded to the Phoenix Suns for Danny Manning, Pat Garrity and two future first round-draft picks.

In 369 regular season games with the Magic, Hardaway averaged 19 points, 6.3 assists, 4.7 rebounds, and 1.9 steals per game. In 45 playoff games he averaged 21.8 points, 6.5 assists, 4.9 rebounds, and 1.9 steals.

Phoenix Suns (1999–2004)
Hardaway landed in Phoenix via a sign-and-trade with Orlando before the start of 1999–2000 NBA season to team with fellow All-Star guard Jason Kidd, forming what the Suns labeled BackCourt 2000. Injuries to Hardaway's foot and Kidd's ankle allowed them to play just 45 games together (33–12 with both in lineup). In 60 games Hardaway averaged 16.9 points, 5.8 rebounds, 5.3 assists, and 1.6 steals with a 42–18 record. The Suns finished with a 53–29 record and a 5th seed in the Western Conference Playoffs. The ankle injury to Kidd forced him to miss most of the first-round series against the defending champion San Antonio Spurs. Hardaway stepped up and recorded a 17-point, 13-assist, 12-rebound triple-double in a crucial Game 3 win. The Suns disposed of the Spurs in four games. The Conference Semi-Finals pitted Hardaway against his former teammate Shaquille O'Neal and the Lakers. The Suns fell short to the eventual champion Lakers in 5 games. Hardaway averaged 20.3 points, 5.7 assists, 4.9 rebounds, 1.6 steals, and 1 block per game during the nine playoff games.

The outlook was optimistic heading into the 2000–01 NBA season, but two microfracture surgeries on his left knee forced Hardaway to miss all but four games during the season. In those four games he averaged 9.8 points, 4.5 rebounds, 3.8 assists, and 1.5 steals.

Hardaway entered the 2001–02 NBA season healthy and managed to play in 80 regular-season games. Kidd and Chris Dudley had been traded to the New Jersey Nets for new point guard Stephon Marbury, Johnny Newman, and Soumaila Samake. Kidd's pass-first style was switched with Marbury's shoot-first style which led to Hardaway and Marbury butting heads. Hardaway managed to average 19.9 points, 5.4 rebounds, 4.6 assists, and 1.7 steals during the month of November. The team traded for guard Joe Johnson during the season which relegated Hardaway to the bench for the first time in his career. Despite this he averaged 12 points, 4.4 rebounds, 4.1 assists, and 1.5 steals during the regular season.

Hardaway entered the 2002–03 NBA season coming off the bench. Inconsistent play by young Joe Johnson allowed Hardaway to get back into the starting lineup early in the season. His steady veteran play was a key component to a team that had young stars such as Marbury, Amar'e Stoudemire, and Shawn Marion. Hardaway did miss 24 games with a hand injury in which the team went 10–14 in his absence. He returned in time to record a 10-point, 10-assist, 10-rebound triple-double on April 9 against the Dallas Mavericks. Hardaway finished the regular season averaging 10.6 points, 4.4 rebounds, 4.1 assists, and 1.1 steals. The Suns gave the eventual Champion San Antonio Spurs a scare in the first round before losing in six games. Hardaway averaged 12.7 points, 6 rebounds, 4.3 assists, and 2.2 steals in the series.

The 2003–04 NBA season saw Hardaway shuffle in and out of the Suns starting lineup. He was traded to the New York Knicks January 6, 2004, along with Marbury and backup center Cezary Trybański in exchange for Howard Eisley, Maciej Lampe, Charlie Ward, and Antonio McDyess. The Suns also received the draft rights of Miloš Vujanić and two first-round draft picks in the deal. He averaged 8.7 points, 2.9 rebounds, and 2.9 assists in 34 games for the Suns. Phoenix used the cap room that was carved out via this trade to sign free-agent point guard Steve Nash to a huge deal starting in 2004–05.

In 236 regular season games with the Suns he averaged 12.4 points, 4.5 rebounds, 4.2 assists, and 1.3 steals. In 15 playoff games he averaged 17.3 points, 5.3 rebounds, 5.1 assists, and 1.8 steals.

New York Knicks (2004–2006)

Hardaway and Marbury helped lead the Knicks to the 2004 NBA Playoffs. In 42 regular-season games with the Knicks, Hardaway averaged 9.6 points, 4.5 rebounds, 1.9 assists, and 1 steal. In 76 total games during the season he averaged 9.2 points, 3.8 rebounds, and 2.3 assists. In the playoffs the Knicks lost in the first round to the New Jersey Nets. Hardaway led the Knicks in scoring in two playoff games while averaging 16.5 points, 5.8 assists, 4.5 rebounds, and 1.5 steals in the series.

Hardaway spent most of 2004–05 NBA season fighting various injuries. He averaged 11.9 points, 2.6 assists, and 2.5 rebounds in an 11-game span during the middle part of the season. He finished the season averaging 7.3 points, 2.4 rebounds, and 2 assists in 37 games.

Hardaway played just four games for the Knicks in the 2005–06 NBA season while trying to rehabilitate arthritic knees. He averaged 2.5 points, 2.5 rebounds, and 2 assists in those games.

In 83 games for the Knicks he averaged 8.2 points, 3.5 rebounds, and 1.9 assists.

On February 22, 2006, Hardaway was traded back to Orlando, along with Trevor Ariza, for Steve Francis. Five days later, the Magic waived Hardaway.

Miami Heat (2007)
On August 9, 2007, Hardaway was signed by the Miami Heat reuniting him with former teammate Shaquille O'Neal. He wore jersey number 7, marking the first time in his pro career that he didn't wear number 1. On December 12, 2007, he was waived by the Miami Heat in order to free up a team spot for free agent Luke Jackson. In 16 regular season games, he averaged 3.8 points, 2.2 rebounds, 2.2 assists & 1.19 steals. His best game of the season was on November 17, with 6–6 shooting for 16 points in a win on the road over New Jersey Nets, 91–87.

Coaching career

In 2011, Hardaway took over for his friend Desmond Merriweather as a coach for his middle school alma mater, Lester Middle School, while Merriweather was undergoing treatment for colon cancer. With a goal to have each of his players graduate from college, Hardaway instituted a mandatory tutoring program. He coached the Lester Lions to the West Tennessee State title 58–57, finishing 28–3 for the season.

Memphis (2018–present)
Hardaway was hired as head coach by his alma mater, the Memphis Tigers, on March 19, 2018. Hardaway was hired to replace former head coach Tubby Smith. In his first year as head coach, Hardaway led the Tigers to the NIT. He also secured the number one recruiting class in the country with the commitments of number one rated high school player James Wiseman,  D. J. Jeffries, who decommitted from Kentucky; Boogie Ellis, who decommitted from Duke; and others. On May 17, 2019, Precious Achiuwa, a top-20 five-star recruit, signed with Memphis.

Television and film
Before Hardaway was drafted, he and future Orlando Magic teammate Shaquille O'Neal acted in prominent roles in the college basketball feature film Blue Chips (1994); Both players portrayed college freshman on the varsity basketball team of a fictional university.

In the mid to late 1990s, Hardaway starred in the Nike advertising campaign "Lil Penny", featuring an alter ego puppet version of Hardaway which was voiced by comedian Chris Rock.

Hardaway was featured in the ESPN 30 for 30 documentary series film This Magic Moment (2016) which focuses on the Orlando Magic teams led by him and Shaquille O'Neal in the mid-1990s.

Other pursuits
Hardaway made more than $120 million in his 16-season career. He owns a barbershop and beauty salon in downtown Memphis and a turf business based in Miami.

Hardaway is also known for his efforts to promote sports in Memphis. In 2010, he helped revitalize the Bluff City Classic, a summer basketball league that provides a high level of competition for men and women players from the college, professional, and elite high school ranks. Hardaway also provided funding to build the University of Memphis Sports Hall of Fame. In 2011, Hardaway announced plans for a permanent $20 million multi-sports facility named FastBreak Courts Sportsplex in Cordova. The sporting complex would support volleyball, cheerleading and wrestling, with seven basketball courts, a 2,000-seat arena, rehabilitation clinic and classrooms. It was expected to boost the Memphis-area economy by generating over $14.5 million in annual visitor spending and directly supporting 236 local jobs.

In 2012, Hardaway was announced to be part of an ownership group including Peyton Manning and Justin Timberlake that was to purchase a minority stake in the Memphis Grizzlies.

Personal life
Penny has a son Jayden who plays guard at the University of Memphis where Penny is head coach. Penny also has two daughters born in 1992 and 1995, both with his former girlfriend from high school. Penny also has a son that was a sophomore in high school in 2017.

Hardaway is a member of Kappa Alpha Psi fraternity.

NBA career statistics

Regular season

|-
| style="text-align:left;"| 1993–94
| style="text-align:left;"| Orlando
| 82 ||82|| 36.8 || .466 || .267 || .742 || 5.4 || 6.6 || 2.3 || 0.6 || 16.0
|-
| style="text-align:left;"| 1994–95
| style="text-align:left;"| Orlando
| 77 || 77 || 37.7 || .512 || .349 || .769 || 4.4 || 7.2 || 1.7 || 0.3 || 20.9
|-
| style="text-align:left;"| 1995–96
| style="text-align:left;"| Orlando
| 82 || 82 || 36.8 || .513 || .314 || .767 || 4.3 || 7.1 || 2.0 || 0.5 || 21.7
|-
| style="text-align:left;"| 1996–97
| style="text-align:left;"| Orlando
| 59 || 59 || 37.6 || .447 || .318 || .820 || 4.5 || 5.6 || 1.6 || 0.6 || 20.5
|-
| style="text-align:left;"| 1997–98
| style="text-align:left;"| Orlando
| 19 || 15 || 32.9 || .377 || .300 || .763 || 4.0 || 3.6 || 1.5 || 0.8 || 16.4
|-
| style="text-align:left;"| 1998–99
| style="text-align:left;"| Orlando
| 50 || 50 || 38.9 || .420 || .286 || .706 || 5.7 || 5.3 || 2.2 || 0.5 || 15.8
|-
| style="text-align:left;"| 1999–00
| style="text-align:left;"| Phoenix
| 60 || 60 || 37.6 || .474 || .324 || .790 || 5.8 || 6.3 || 1.6 || 0.6 || 16.9
|-
| style="text-align:left;"| 2000–01
| style="text-align:left;"| Phoenix
| 4 || 4 || 28.0 || .416 || .250 || .636 || 4.5 || 3.8 || 1.5 || 0.3 || 9.8
|-
| style="text-align:left;"| 2001–02
| style="text-align:left;"| Phoenix
| 80 || 56 || 30.8 || .418 || .277 || .810 || 4.4 || 4.1 || 1.5 || 0.4 || 12.0
|-
| style="text-align:left;"| 2002–03
| style="text-align:left;"| Phoenix
| 58 || 51 || 30.6 || .447 || .356 || .794 || 4.4 || 4.1 || 1.1 || 0.4 || 10.6
|-
| style="text-align:left;"| 2003–04
| style="text-align:left;"| Phoenix
| 34 || 10 || 25.8 || .443 || .400 || .857 || 2.9 || 2.9 || 0.8 || 0.2 || 8.7
|-
| style="text-align:left;"| 2003–04
| style="text-align:left;"| New York
| 42 || 4 || 29.0 || .390 || .364 || .775 || 4.5 || 1.9 || 1.0 || 0.3 || 9.6
|-
| style="text-align:left;"| 2004–05
| style="text-align:left;"| New York
| 37 || 0 || 24.2 || .423 || .300 || .739 || 2.4 || 2.0 || 0.8 || 0.1 || 7.3
|-
| style="text-align:left;"| 2005–06
| style="text-align:left;"| New York
| 4 || 0 || 18.0 || .286 || .000 || 1.000 || 2.5 || 2.0 || 0.5 || 0.0 || 2.5
|-
| style="text-align:left;"| 2007–08
| style="text-align:left;"| Miami
| 16 || 8 || 20.3 || .367 || .421 || .889 || 2.2 || 2.2 || 1.2 || 0.1 || 3.8
|- class="sortbottom"
| style="text-align:center;" colspan="2"| Career
| 704 || 558 || 33.7 || .458 || .316 || .774 || 4.5 || 5.0 || 1.6 || 0.4 || 15.2
|- class="sortbottom"
| style="text-align:center;" colspan="2"| All-Star
| 4 || 4 || 24.5 || .625 || .417 || .833 || 3.7 || 6.0 || 1.0 || 0.0 || 13.7

Playoffs

|-
| style="text-align:left;"| 1994
| style="text-align:left;"| Orlando
| 3 || 3 || 44.3 || .440 || .455 || .700 || 6.7 || 7.0 || 1.7 || 2.0 || 18.7
|-
| style="text-align:left;"| 1995
| style="text-align:left;"| Orlando
| 21 || 21 || 40.4 || .472 || .404 || .757 || 3.8 || 7.7 || 1.9 || 0.7 || 19.6
|-
| style="text-align:left;"| 1996
| style="text-align:left;"| Orlando
| 12 || 12 || 39.4 || .465 || .364 || .744 || 4.7 || 6.0 || 1.7 || 0.3 || 23.3
|-
| style="text-align:left;"| 1997
| style="text-align:left;"| Orlando
| 5 || 5 || 44.0 || .468 || .367 || .741 || 6.0 || 3.4 || 2.4 || 1.4 || 31.0
|-
| style="text-align:left;"| 1999
| style="text-align:left;"| Orlando
| 4 || 4 || 41.8 || .351 || .462 || .769 || 5.0 || 5.5 || 2.3 || 0.3 || 19.0
|-
| style="text-align:left;"| 2000
| style="text-align:left;"| Phoenix
| 9 || 9 || 42.9 || .462 || .263 || .710 || 4.9 || 5.7 || 1.6 || 1.2 || 20.3
|-
| style="text-align:left;"| 2003
| style="text-align:left;"| Phoenix
| 6 || 6 || 40.7 || .386 || .360 || .722 || 6.0 || 4.3 || 2.2 || 0.8 || 12.7
|-
| style="text-align:left;"| 2004
| style="text-align:left;"| New York
| 4 || 3 || 42.0 || .365 || .357 || .833 || 4.5 || 5.8 || 1.5 || 0.3 || 16.5
|- class="sortbottom"
| style="text-align:center;" colspan="2"| Career
| 64 || 63 || 41.3 || .448 || .380 || .746 || 4.7 || 6.2 || 1.9 || 0.8 || 20.4

Appearances on regular season leader board
 Top 10 Games Played: 1994, 1996, 1999
 Top 10 Minutes Played: 1994, 1999
 Top 10 Field Goals: 1996
 Top 10 Free Throws: 1996
 Top 10 Free Throws Attempted: 1996
 Top 15 Points: 1995, 1996
 Top 15 Assists: 1994, 1995, 1996
 Top 10 Steals: 1994, 1996, 1999
 Top 10 Player Efficiency Rating: 1996

Appearances on playoff leader board
 Top 10 Minutes Per Game: 1994 (3rd), 1997 (4th), 1999, 2000, 2004
 Top 5 Games Played: 1995
 Top 10 Field Goals: 1995, 1996
 Top 10 Free Throws Made: 1995, 1996
 Top 10 3PT Field Goals: 1995
 Top 10 Assists Per Game: 1994, 1995, 1996, 2000, 2004
 Top 10 Points: 1995 (5th), 1996
 Top 10 Points Per Game: 1996, 1997 (2nd)
 Top 5 Steals: 1995, 1997 (3rd), 1999 (5th), 2003 (4th)

Head coaching record

College

References

External links

 

1971 births
Living people
African-American basketball players
All-American college men's basketball players
American men's basketball coaches
American men's basketball players
American shooting survivors
Basketball coaches from Tennessee
Basketball players at the 1996 Summer Olympics
Basketball players from Memphis, Tennessee
College men's basketball head coaches in the United States
Golden State Warriors draft picks
High school basketball coaches in the United States
Medalists at the 1996 Summer Olympics
Memphis Tigers men's basketball coaches
Memphis Tigers men's basketball players
Miami Heat players
National Basketball Association All-Stars
New York Knicks players
Olympic gold medalists for the United States in basketball
Orlando Magic players
Parade High School All-Americans (boys' basketball)
Phoenix Suns players
Point guards
Shooting guards
Small forwards
Sportspeople from Memphis, Tennessee
United States men's national basketball team players
21st-century African-American sportspeople
20th-century African-American sportspeople